Spend the Night may refer to:

 Spend the Night (The Donnas album), 2002
 Spend the Night (Isley Brothers album), 1989 
 "Spend the Night", a 1985 song by The Cool Notes
 "Spend the Night" (song), a 1998 song by Danny J Lewis
 "Spend the Night in Love", a 1980 song by The Four Seasons
 "Spend the Night", a song by E-40 featuring Laroo, the DB'z, Droop-E & B-Slimm, from the album Revenue Retrievin': Night Shift
 "Spend the Night", a 2010 song by Plies, from the album Da REAList